Parallel Voices is a 2005 Kazakhstani musical drama film  written and directed by Rustam Khamdamov. It was the first film directed by Khamdamov after a 14 years hiatus. It was entered into the Horizons section at the 62nd edition of the Venice Film Festival.

Plot 
 
A group of Russian artists met in a desolate hangar, where they will alternate classical arias and discussions about the sense of life.

Cast   
  
 Renata Litvinova as herself
  as herself
 Bibigul Tulegenova as herself
 Erik Kurmangaliev as himself
   as herself

References

External links  

Kazakhstani drama films
2000s musical drama films
2005 drama films
2005 films